Christophe Naudin (born 22 December 1962) is a French writer.

Education and background
Christophe Naudin holds 
 a PhD in geography from Paris-Sorbonne University
 a commercial pilot licence, multiengine, instrument rating
 a postgraduate degree in geopolitics from the University of Paris – Marne la Vallée
 MA degree in geography from the Paris Diderot University

Biography
Before 1995, he was an instructor in aviation security for the French SWAT police (RAID – Recherche, Assistance, Intervention, Dissuasion) for airport security and border control, before the pre-privatization measures with the equivalent of TSA Transportation Security Administration.

Since 1996, he has taught X-ray screening for the French gendarmerie, showing how to place laptops correctly in plastic baskets in and for correctional institution since 2000. He is a trainer for the French national police and the gendarmerie, working within the French police cooperation unit (DCI) since 1997.

Since September 2005, he has been a speaker at the University of the Chinese People's Public Security (Beijing) and the Graduate School of Criminal Police in Shenyang.

In 1996 he created, with Sébastien Benoit-Latour, a US consultancy firm based in West Palm Beach, Florida.

In February 2016, Naudin was kidnapped in Cairo with a false Red Notice held by Dominican secret services for being sought by the Dominican Republic. He was accused of being directly involved in the Air Cocaïne business for helping the escape and exfiltration of two "pilot friends", Pascal Fauret and Bruno Odos. On February 27, Egypt agreed to extradite Naudin to the Dominican Republic to face criminal charges. Theses men were declared innocent of all Dominican or French charges by Aix-en-Provence Court of Appeal on 8 July 2021.

Books
 Alias, le nouvel empire des crimes d'identité, Publisher La Table Ronde,  Paris February 2005
 Sûreté aérienne, la grande illusion,  Publisher La Table Ronde, March 2007
 Histoire de l'identité individuelle – d'hier et de demain, Publisher Ellipses, 2009
 Sûreté mode d'emploi. Publisher Ellipses, 2011
 Air Cocaïne, les dessous d'une mystification d'un narco Etat, publisher L'Archipel, Paris May 2021

Articles
 Défense nationale N°3 : Fausse identité, nouvelle menace stratégique ? 2005
 Cahier de la sécurité N°6 – INHES, Cybercriminalité identitaire, sept.–déc. 2008 
 Outre Terre N°23 : Union pour la méditerranée contre Al-Qaïda, 2009
 Défense nationale N°12 : Identité et défense : vulnérabilité d'hier, atout stratégique de demain ?, novembre 2009

PhD 
His doctoral thesis, "Doctorat d'État de géographie de l'école doctorale N°7", was delivered by Université Paris IV – Paris Sorbonne. His geography thesis titled "Géopolitique identitaire : le grand défi du 21e siècle", was directed by professor Michel Korinman. His dissertation committee was presided by Gérard-François Dumont.

References 

1962 births
Living people
People from Libourne
Paris Diderot University alumni
Paris-Sorbonne University alumni
French criminologists